Cuba–Palestine relations refers to the bilateral relations between Cuba and Palestine. Palestine has an embassy in Havana.

Timeline 
During the vote on the resolution to partition Mandatory Palestine, Cuba voted against the resolution. The reason for this was "because they could not be a party to the coercion of the majority in Palestine". The Cuban delegation reported that it was pressured to vote yes.

In 1973, Fidel Castro announced at the fourth summit of the Non-Aligned countries in Algeria the severance of diplomatic relations with Israel and the recognition of the Palestine Liberation Organization. The next year, Yasser Arafat the leader of the PLO was received as a head of state, with the subsequent establishment of Palestine’s embassy.

References 

Palestine
Cuba